{{DISPLAYTITLE:C14H20N2O3}}
The molecular formula C14H20N2O3 (molar mass: 264.32 g/mol, exact mass: 264.1474 u) may refer to:

 Propacetamol
 Vorinostat, also known as suberanilohydroxamic acid

Molecular formulas